Adis Jasić (born 12 February 2003) is an Austrian footballer of Bosnian descent currently playing as a midfielder for Wolfsberg.

Career statistics

Club

Notes

References

2003 births
Living people
People from Sankt Veit an der Glan
Austrian footballers
Austria youth international footballers
Association football midfielders
Austrian Regionalliga players
Austrian Football Bundesliga players
Wolfsberger AC players
Austrian people of Bosnia and Herzegovina descent
Footballers from Carinthia (state)